The following is an incomplete list of country music festivals, which encapsulates music festivals focused on country music. This list may have some overlap with the larger topic list of folk festivals, and may also overlap with the related topics list of blues festivals, list of jam band music festivals, list of bluegrass music festivals, and list of old-time music festivals.  Many of the festivals take place in North America.

Country music is a genre of American popular music that originated in Southern United States, in Atlanta, Georgia in the 1920s, and It takes its roots from the southeastern genre of American folk music and Western music. The origins of country music are the folk music of mostly white, working-class Americans, who blended popular songs, Irish and Celtic fiddle tunes, traditional ballads, and cowboy songs, and various musical traditions from European immigrant communities. Barn dancing and other folk dance styles would be featured at country music gatherings, and many modern festivals have continued to feature dance, rodeo, or other cultural aspects.

The term country music gained popularity in the 1940s in preference to the earlier term hillbilly music, it came to encompass Western music, which evolved parallel to hillbilly music from similar roots, in the mid-20th century. The term country music is used today to describe many styles and subgenres, and festivals may focus on Americana genres such as bluegrass, or newer genres such as country rock, country pop, or alternative country.

Festivals

Oceania

Europe

North America
Canada

United States

Gallery

See also

 :Category:Country music festivals
 :Category:Old-time music festivals
 :Category:Rock festivals
List of music festivals (Category)
List of folk festivals (Category)
List of blues festivals (Category)
List of bluegrass music festivals (Category)
List of jam band music festivals (Category)

References

External links

Country Music Festivals

Country